Franklin Estebán Anangonó Tadeo (12 December 1974 – 13 June 2022) was an Ecuadorian football player and manager who played as a defender. He obtained seven international caps for the Ecuador national team in 1999.

Honors
Ecuador
 Canada Cup: 1999

References

External links

1974 births
2022 deaths
Footballers from Quito
Ecuadorian footballers
Association football defenders
Ecuador international footballers
1999 Copa América players
C.D. ESPOLI footballers
C.D. El Nacional footballers
C.D. Técnico Universitario footballers
C.S.D. Macará footballers
Ecuadorian football managers
S.D. Aucas managers
Ecuadorian expatriate footballers
Ecuadorian expatriate sportspeople in Mexico
Expatriate footballers in Mexico